Larry Woods (2 August 1939 – 26 January 2016) was a Canadian sailor. He competed in the Tornado event at the 1976 Summer Olympics.

References

External links
 

1939 births
2016 deaths
Canadian male sailors (sport)
Olympic sailors of Canada
Sailors at the 1976 Summer Olympics – Tornado
Sportspeople from Hamilton, Ontario